is a Japanese professional baseball pitcher. He was born on December 20, 1987 in Tokyo, Japan. He is currently playing for the Hokkaido Nippon-Ham Fighters of the NPB.

References

1987 births
Living people
Baseball people from Tokyo
Japanese baseball players
Nippon Professional Baseball pitchers
Hokkaido Nippon-Ham Fighters players